Peitho (minor planet designation: 118 Peitho) is a main-belt asteroid. It is probably an S-type asteroid, suggesting a siliceous mineralogy. It was discovered by R. Luther on March 15, 1872, and named after one of the two Peithos in Greek mythology. There have been two observed Peithoan occultations of a dim star: one was in 2000 and the other in 2003.

This body is orbiting the Sun with a period of 3.81 years and an eccentricity (ovalness) of 0.16. The orbital plane is inclined by 7.7° to the plane of the ecliptic. The cross-section diameter is ~42 km. In 2009, Photometric observations of this asteroid were made at the Palmer Divide Observatory in Colorado Springs, Colorado. The resulting asymmetrical light curve shows a synodic rotation period of 7.823 ± 0.002 hours with a brightness variation of 0.15 ± 0.02 in magnitude. This was reasonably consistent with independent studies performed in 1980 (7.78 hours) and 2009 (7.8033 hours). The lightcurve inversion process has been used to construct a model of this object, suggesting a blocky shape with flattened poles.

References

External links 
 Lightcurve plot of 118 Peitho, Palmer Divide Observatory, B. D. Warner (2009)
 Asteroid Lightcurve Database (LCDB), query form (info )
 Dictionary of Minor Planet Names, Google books
 Asteroids and comets rotation curves, CdR – Observatoire de Genève, Raoul Behrend
 Discovery Circumstances: Numbered Minor Planets (1)-(5000) – Minor Planet Center
 
 

000118
Discoveries by Robert Luther
Named minor planets
000118
000118
000118
18720315